Antonio Rodríguez de Pazos y Figueroa (died 1586) was a Roman Catholic prelate who served as Bishop of Córdoba (1582–1586) and Bishop of Patti (1568–1578).

Biography
On 17 September 1568, Antonio Rodríguez de Pazos y Figueroa was appointed during the papacy of Pope Pius V as Bishop of Patti.
On 8 December 1568, he was consecrated bishop by Francisco Pacheco de Villena, Cardinal-Deacon of Santa Croce in Gerusalemme, with Gaspar Cervantes de Gaete, Archbishop of Tarragona, and Diego de Simancas, Bishop of Badajoz, serving as co-consecrators. He resigned as Bishop of Patti on 29 October 1578.
On 19 March 1582, he was appointed during the papacy of Pope Gregory XIII as Bishop of Córdoba.
He served as Bishop of Córdoba until his death on 28 June 1586.

Episcopal succession
While bishop, he was the principal consecrator of: 
Pedro Fernández Temiño, Bishop of Ávila (1582); 
and the principal co-consecrator of: 
Rodrigo de Vadillo, Bishop of Cefalù (1569);
Jerónimo Albornoz, Bishop of Córdoba (1571);
Antonio Paliettino (de Monelia), Bishop of Brugnato (1571); and
Andrés Cabrera Bobadilla, Bishop of Segovia (1583).

References

External links and additional sources
 (for Chronology of Bishops) 
 (for Chronology of Bishops) 
 (for Chronology of Bishops) 
 (for Chronology of Bishops) 

16th-century Roman Catholic bishops in Spain
Bishops appointed by Pope Pius V
Bishops appointed by Pope Gregory XIII
1586 deaths